"Kindly Keep It Country" is a song written and recorded by the American country music artist Vince Gill. It was released in October 1998 as the second single from the album The Key. The song features vocals from Lee Ann Womack, a then up-and-coming artist, and reached number 33 on the Billboard Hot Country Singles & Tracks chart.

Chart performance

References

1998 singles
1998 songs
Vince Gill songs
Songs written by Vince Gill
Song recordings produced by Tony Brown (record producer)
MCA Nashville Records singles